AS Salé may refer to:
 AS Salé (basketball), basketball section of the multi-sports club
 AS Salé (football), football section of the multi-sports club